Snowdown Colliery Welfare F.C. was an association football club based in Snowdown, Kent.  The club competed in the original Kent League, Aetolian League, and second Kent League from the 1940s to the 1970s and also entered the FA Cup on a number of occasions.

The club was formed in 1943. They entered the Kent League the following season, and won the League Cup. In 1948 manager Jack Oakes (ex-Charlton Athletic) built up a strong and successful side. In 1950–51 the club won the Kent Senior Cup, defeating Bromley 2–1 in the final, after a replay. That season they were runners-up in the Kent League, losing the title only on goal average. They won the Kent League Cup, and established a club record of 26 games without defeat. They last played in the Kent County League in the early 2000s.

In 1954–55 the club won the Kent League championship, and in 1955–56 they won the Kent Senior Cup again, defeating Dartford 2–0 in the final, after a replay.

Snowdown CW were founder members of the Aetolian League in 1959. They won the championship in 1960–61.

The club colours of black and white striped shirts were worn in tribute to Newcastle United. After the coal industry started in east Kent in the 1920s, families moved from the north east of England to find employment in the mines. The colliery team included some Geordie players and in their heyday in the 1950s the team played their football in the characteristic tough Geordie style.

References

Defunct football clubs in England
Southern Counties East Football League
Mining association football teams in England
Aetolian League (football)
Kent Football League (1894–1959)
Defunct football clubs in Kent
Association football clubs disestablished in 1943